Johann Christoph von Naumann was the urban designer who, with Matthäus Daniel Pöppelmann, designed portions of the city of Warsaw, Poland, including the Saxon Axis and other important streetscapes. 1729-30 he modernized the town hall at Bautzen where he had already added the upper storeys to Reichenturm tower in 1718. He worked in remodeling the Opernhaus am Taschenberg in Dresden to the first Catholic Hofkirche. 

18th-century German architects
Jauch family